is a railway station on the Echigo Line in Chūō-ku, Niigata, Japan, operated by East Japan Railway Company (JR East).

Lines
Hakusan Station is served by the Echigo Line, and is 80.7 kilometers from the starting point of the line at Kashiwazaki Station.

Station layout
The station has a "Midori no Madoguchi" staffed ticket counter. Suica farecards can be used at this station.

Platforms

History
The station opened on 15 December 1951. With the privatization of Japanese National Railways (JNR) on 1 April 1987, the station came under the control of JR East.

Passenger statistics
In fiscal 2017, the station was used by an average of 5360 passengers daily (boarding passengers only). The passenger figures for previous years are as shown below.

Surrounding area
 Hakusan Park
 Niigata City Athletic Stadium
 Niigata-City Performing Arts Center (Ryutopia)
 Niigata Prefectural Civic Center
 Niigata City Gymnasium

See also
 List of railway stations in Japan

References

External links

  

Railway stations in Niigata (city)
Railway stations in Japan opened in 1951
Stations of East Japan Railway Company
Echigo Line